Mary Eleanor Comfort Leonard (January 22, 1856 – August 4, 1940) was born in Kosciusko, Mississippi. She was one of the three founders of the Delta Gamma Fraternity, along with Anna Boyd Ellington and Eva Webb Dodd, in 1873 at the Lewis School in Oxford, Mississippi.

Biography
Leonard was born as one of 13 children of Daniel Benjamin Comfort II and Eliza Love Durham. After her initial education, she attended the Lewis School in Oxford, Mississippi for three years. While at the Lewis School she met her husband Charles Henry Leonard, a student at the nearby University of Mississippi, and a member of Delta Psi while at Mississippi.

Delta Gamma supports a project that traces descendants of the founders, and through this has noted six women in Leonard's family tree that would eventually join the sorority.

References

1856 births
1940 deaths
Schoolteachers from Mississippi
American women educators
People from Kosciusko, Mississippi
Delta Gamma founders